The Chowchilla Mountains are a mountain range in Mariposa County, California.

References 

Mountain ranges of Northern California
Mountain ranges of Mariposa County, California